Serbia competed at the 2015 World Championships in Athletics in Beijing, China, from 22–30 August 2015.

Medalists

Results
(q – qualified, NM – no mark, SB – season best)

Men
Track and road events

Field events

Women 
Track and road events

Field events

Sources 
Serbian team

Nations at the 2015 World Championships in Athletics
World Championships in Athletics
Serbia at the World Championships in Athletics